General elections were held in Bulgaria on 14 November 2021 to elect both the President and the National Assembly. They were the country's third parliamentary elections in 2021, with no party able to form a government after the elections in April and July. A second round of the presidential elections were held on 21 November 2021 as no candidate was able to receive a majority of the vote in the first round.  

We Continue the Change won the most seats, although it was not a majority. Shortly after the election, they announced that coalition talks were going to be held. Incumbent president Rumen Radev gathered 66.72% of the vote, defeating university professor Anastas Gerdzhikov in a runoff.

Nationwide turnout in the parliamentary and first presidential round fell to 38% Bulgaria's lowest participation rate in 30 years for both presidential and legislative elections. Nationwide turnout in the second presidential round experienced another drop, featuring only 33% of registered voters. 

The leaders of PP, BSP, ITN, and DB announced on 10 December that they had agreed to form a coalition that would end a months-long political crisis. President Radev shortly after announced that he had given the mandate to form a government to Petkov. On 12 December, Kiril Petkov presented the composition of the incoming government, and it was approved on 13 December by the National Assembly.

Background

The previous parliamentary election which was held in July 2021, resulted in a narrow victory for the newly established There Is Such A People (ITN) over the ruling GERB party; however, ITN won only 65 out of 240 seats in the National Assembly of Bulgaria. Following the elections, ITN opted to try and form a minority government and started talks with potential partners (DB, IBG-NI, and BSP) in order to secure their support. Nevertheless, these attempts proved unsuccessful, and ITN announced on 10 August that they were withdrawing their proposed cabinet, making a third election more likely. Slavi Trifonov, the leader of ITN, said in a video statement that this meant new elections. The mandate to form a cabinet went to GERB.

GERB, the party of the previous prime minister Boyko Borisov, said earlier that it would not try to form a government. The BSP said that if the scenario repeats itself, it would suggest that the incumbent caretaker cabinet becomes permanent. IBG-NI also expressed confidence that it could come up with a solution if handed the mandate to form a government. Trifonov subsequently announced that he would not support any other parties proposing a cabinet. Parliament announced on 2 September that Bulgaria would hold the first round of the presidential election on 14 November, with a snap election likely to take place in the same month.

On 6 September 2021, BSP handed back the last mandate of forming a government, meaning the parliament would be dissolved and a third parliamentary election would officially take place in 2021. President Rumen Radev declared on 11 September that there would be two-in-one elections on 14 November for the first time in Bulgarian history, where voters would be able to vote on the president and the parliament. This decision was taken "to save treasury costs and voters' time".

Electoral system
The 240 members of the National Assembly are elected by open list proportional representation from 31 multi-member constituencies ranging in size from 4 to 16 seats. The electoral threshold is 4% for parties, with seats allocated according to the largest remainder method.

The President of Bulgaria is elected using the two-round system, with voters also given a none of the above option.

Parties and coalitions

Parliamentary parties

Parties admitted to the elections
When only some of the leaders of a coalition are its official representatives, their names are in bold. All lines with a light grey background indicate support for a party or coalition that has been agreed upon outside of the official CEC electoral registration.

Presidential candidates

Candidates admitted to the elections

Campaign
The campaign started after the election was officially announced for 14 November. The pandemic remained a large issue, especially with the rise of the Delta variant in the country. The anti-corruption parties (ITN, DB, and IBG-NI) were all looking to hold their ground, while the established parties (GERB, DPS, and BSP) wanted to capitalise on public frustrations with the inability to form a government. The elections were widely hoped to bring an end to the political stalemate that had lasted since the April 2021 elections, after which no government could be formed. This time, there was more pressure on the anti-establishment parties to start negotiating a coalition government after the elections.

After the president announced the new caretaker cabinet, the economy and finance ministers who were replaced in the reshuffle, Kiril Petkov and Asen Vasilev, announced that they would compete in the November election as part of a new coalition named We Continue the Change, with the aim of becoming a new anti-corruption force that could form an effective government.

The global energy crisis was a large issue in the campaign, with natural gas prices soaring to record highs. Campaigning parties offered varying solutions to address this, with some supporting more reliance on Russia for energy, while others proposed domestic nuclear power in the longer term. The campaign was also influenced by the high levels of inflation in the country, which hit record levels at 4.8% in September, causing public dissatisfaction.

Another important issue was COVID-19 vaccinations. Due to a low vaccine take-up and high rises in the number of cases, the caretaker government implemented a "green pass", also known as the vaccine passport. The green pass required citizens to provide proof of their vaccination status in several locations such as hospitals, schools and restaurants. The measure was met with widespread protests.

On 6 October, the instructions of the Minister of Health and the Chief State Health Inspector for voting were approved, and did not differ from those for the elections on 11 July. Deputy Chairman of the Central Election Commission, Rositsa Mateva, said "there is no requirement for a green certificate for voting in the parliamentary and presidential elections on 14 November."

Bulgaria's Central Election Commission accepted the registration of 23 candidates for the presidential elections, announced after the deadline for applications on 12 October. This was the largest number of candidates in a presidential election in Bulgaria since the country began direct democratic elections for its head of state; previously, the highest number was 21, which occurred in 1992 and 2016.

The Organization for Security and Co-operation in Europe (OSCE) announced in a statement that it would send an observation team to the general elections, following an invitation from the authorities of Bulgaria. It noted that the Office for Democratic Institutions and Human Rights (ODIHR) had previously observed 12 elections in the country, most recently the 11 July 2021 early parliamentary elections.

Opinion polls

Legislative election
Graphical representation of recalculated data

The opinion poll results below were recalculated from the original data and exclude polls that chose "I will not vote" or "I am uncertain" options.

Presidential election 
Graphical representation of recalculated data
First round

The opinion poll results below were recalculated from the original data and exclude polls that chose "I will not vote" or "I am uncertain" options.

Hypothetical second round

Results
Polling stations opened at 08:00 and closed at 20:00. Kiril Petkov and Asen Vasilev were viewed as the winners of the legislative elections. Their party (We Continue the Change) received more than 25% of the vote. GERB remained second with more than 22%. DPS finished third place with over 13%, overtaking BSP, who finished fourth with around 10%. There Is Such a People, the winner of the previous election, was seen as the election loser, dropping to fifth with less than 10% of the vote. Democratic Bulgaria also dropped significantly in support, losing over 50% of their voters from the previous election and receiving only around 6% of the vote. Lastly, Revival managed to enter the parliament with around 5% of the votes, running on a campaign of Bulgarian nationalism and opposition to vaccine mandates. Stand Up BG! We're coming! lost all their seats in the parliament, receiving only 2%, whilst IMRO did not succeed in entering parliament.

We Continue the Change won the most votes in 14 districts of the country, including all three in the capital, Sofia. They also won in major cities such as Burgas, Varna and Plovdiv. GERB—SDS won in 12 districts, including Sofia-Oblast, Gabrovo, and Blagoevgrad. DPS was first in five districts in Kardzhali and Razgrad, as well as in Targovishte, Silistra, and Shumen. The results of the overseas vote differed from those in the country, as DPS received the most votes abroad with over 38% support. In second place abroad was We Continue the Change with over 22 percent. There Is Such a People, which was helped by the votes abroad, finished third, and GERB—SDS came fourth.

Incumbent president Radev received around 49% of the vote and was forced into a runoff against university professor Gerdzhikov on 21 November. Shortly after the second round of the presidential elections, President Radev was projected to win another term with nearly two-thirds of the vote, according to exit polls published by Alpha Research and Gallup International. Voter turnout stood at a record-low 33.7% and 3.0% of people who went to the polls did not support either of the two candidates, according to Alpha Research polling agency.

President

National Assembly

Voter Demographics
Gallup exit polling suggested the following demographic breakdown. The parties which got below 4% of the vote are included in 'Others':

By constituency

Aftermath 

Following the DB coalition's poor results in the elections, Hristo Ivanov and the entire party leadership of Yes, Bulgaria! announced their resignations on 15 November. Korneliya Ninova, the leader of BSP, also resigned after her party's "catastrophic" result, winning only 26 seats and falling to fourth place. However, both were reaffirmed as party leaders by early February 2022.

Following the PP victory, Petkov told reporters after initial results were released that "Bulgaria is taking a new path. If we can stop [corruption] and redistribute money for the well-being of the taxpayers, then we should be able to come to an agreement with several parties." Petkov said he was willing to work with all parties that would join the fight against corruption in Bulgaria. He announced he was seeking to become prime minister and said he wanted to pursue "transparent" coalition negotiations with DB and There Is Such a People. DPS and GERB rejected coalition talks with PP. Analysts such as Boryana Dimitrova and Parvan Simeonov predicted that PP, ITN, DB, and BSP would form a coalition. 

Shortly after exit polls projected that President Radev had won another term with nearly two-thirds of the vote, he commented in a statement that "an unprecedented political month of two types of elections ended, which clearly showed the will of the people to change and to break with corruption, robbery and lawlessness, to remove the mafia from power." PP co-leaders Kiril Petkov and Assen Vassilev congratulated Radev on his re-election victory: "We are ready to work with this president," Petkov said at a briefing after the end of election day. Vassilev commented that: "Next week we are beginning work on developing a clear and precise plan on how to make Bulgaria a much better place to live in the coming 4 years".

A series of talks on 18 policy areas were held between 23 November and 27 November, between the representatives of PP, BSP, ITN, and DB.

The leaders of four Bulgarian parties on 10 December said they had agreed to form a coalition that would end a months-long political crisis, making it the first regular government since April. The agreement followed lengthy talks between PP, DB, ITN and BSP. Kiril Petkov announced, "we are moving towards proposing a stable government, which we hope will continue for the next four years." Shortly later, President Radev announced that he had given the mandate to form a government to Petkov. On 12 December, Petkov presented the composition of the incoming government, and it was approved by the National Assembly on 13 December 2021.

See also
Corruption in Bulgaria

Notes

References

General
Presidential elections in Bulgaria
Parliamentary elections in Bulgaria
Bulgaria
Bulgaria